Concordia Sagittaria is a town and comune in the Metropolitan City of Venice, Veneto, Italy.

History
The town was founded in 42 BC as Iulia Concordia by the Romans, where the Via Annia and the Via Postumia crossed each other. The city was taken and destroyed by Attila in 452 AD.

After the fall of the Western Roman Empire it was part of the Lombard duchy of Cividale, and later was first in the March of Friuli and then in the Patriarchate of Aquileia.

In 1420, together with all Friuli, it was annexed by the Republic of Venice.

In 1838 it was separated from Friuli to be included in the province of Venice.

Main sights
Trichora Martyrium (350 AD) 
Remains of the Roman Bridge (1st–2nd century AD) 
Bishop's Palace (15th century) 
Baptistery (11th century) 
Cathedral of St. Stephen (1466)

References

Cities and towns in Veneto
Roman towns and cities in Italy